President Ji may refer to:

Ji Chaoding (1903–1963), Chinese economist, president of the Chicago Chinese Student Association in the 1920s
Ji Baocheng (born 1944), Chinese educator, president of Renmin University of China from 2000 to 2011
Ji Jiafu (born 1959), Chinese surgical oncologist, president of Peking University Cancer Hospital since 2011
Ji Xiangqi (born 1960), Chinese politician and business executive, president of Shandong Commercial Group from 2002 to 2010
Ji Sang-wook (born 1965), South Korean politician, president of the New Conservative Party since 2020

See also
Ji (surname), a list of the various Chinese surnames romanised as Ji
-ji, an honorific suffix in various South Asian languages
Xi Jinping (born 1953), General Secretary of the Chinese Communist Party and China's top leader since 2012